The women's singles competition of the table tennis events at the 2019 Southeast Asian Games was held from 8 to 10 December at the Subic Bay Exhibition & Convention Center in Subic Bay Freeport Zone, Zambales, Philippines.

Schedule
All times are Philippines Time (UTC+08:00).

Results

Preliminary round

Group 1

Group 2

Group 3

Group 4

Knockout round

Semifinals

Gold-medal match

References

External links
 

Women's singles
Women's sports competitions in the Philippines
South